Wilhelm Brese (December 28, 1896 – March 9, 1994) was a German politician of the Christian Democratic Union (CDU) and former member of the German Bundestag.

Life 
In 1945 Brese participated in the foundation of the CDU in the administrative district of Celle and was there from 1946 to 1966 also district chairman as well as temporarily district chairman in the district association Lüneburg. He was a member of the German Bundestag from 1949 to 1969. In the first three federal elections he entered parliament via the state list of the CDU Lower Saxony. In 1961 and 1965 he won the direct mandate in the constituency of Celle.

Literature

References

1896 births
1994 deaths
Members of the Bundestag for Lower Saxony
Members of the Bundestag 1965–1969
Members of the Bundestag 1961–1965
Members of the Bundestag 1957–1961
Members of the Bundestag 1953–1957
Members of the Bundestag 1949–1953
Members of the Bundestag for the Christian Democratic Union of Germany